Sharon Costantino (born 15 May 1975) is a Maltese retired footballer who played as a goalkeeper. She has been a member of the Malta women's national team.

References

1975 births
Living people
Women's association football goalkeepers
Maltese women's footballers
Malta women's international footballers